Max Gold (born Vienna, Austria; died Tehran, Iran) was an early twentieth century Austrian football (soccer) right full back who played professionally in Austria and the United States.  He also earned two caps with the Austria national football team in 1922.

Player

Club career
Gold began his career with Wiener AF, gaining entry into the first team during the 1919–1920 season.  He won the 1922 Austrian Cup with Wiener.  In the fall of 1922, Gold transferred to Hakoah Vienna.  In the summer of 1924 he played for Makkabi Tallinn in Estonia.  He was back with Hakoah in the fall and won the 1924–1925 league title with them.  In 1927, Gold moved to the New York Giants of the American Soccer League following a Hakoah Vienna tour of the United States.  In 1928, the owner of the Giants, Charles Stoneham, instrumental in kicking off the “Soccer Wars” which resulted in FIFA declaring the ASL and Giants “outlaws”.  Gold returned to Austria and spent the 1928–1929 season with Wiener AC.   By 1929, the Soccer Wars had been resolved and in August 1929, he moved back to the ASL to play for the Hakoah All-Stars. An injury suffered during the season led to the end of his playing career.

National team
In 1922, Gold earned two caps with the Austria national football team.  The first was a 1–1 tie with Hungary followed by a 7–1 victory over Switzerland.

Coach
Following his retirement from playing, Gold embarked on a career as team owner and manager.  He had briefly coached Makkabi Kaunas in Estonia during the summer 1925.  He now became the owner and manager of Maccabi Chicago and later coached in Luxembourg and Vienna.

References

External links
 1924/25 Hakoah Vienna team photo
 Hakoah-Vienna Club

1900 births
1961 deaths
Austrian footballers
Austrian expatriate footballers
Austria international footballers
Jewish footballers
Austrian Jews
SC Hakoah Wien footballers
American Soccer League (1921–1933) players
New York Giants (soccer) players
Hakoah All-Stars players
Association football fullbacks
Austrian expatriate sportspeople in the United States